Kunzea spathulata is a species of flowering plant in the myrtle family, Myrtaceae and is endemic to a small area in the south west of Western Australia. It is a tall shrub with erect, much-branched stems, linear leaves and more or less spherical groups of yellow or yellowish green flowers.

Description
The flowers are arranged in more or less spherical groups of between ten and eighteen, mostly on the ends of the branches. There are egg-shaped bracts and pairs of bracteoles at the base of the flowers. Flowering occurs in October and November.

Taxonomy and naming
Kunzea spathulata was first formally described in 1996 by Hellmut R. Toelken from a specimen collected near Nannup and the description was published in the Journal of the Adelaide Botanic Gardens. The specific epithet (spathulata) refers to the spatula-shaped bracteoles of this kunzea.

Distribution and habitat
This kunzea is found around marshes and swampy areas, mainly near Augusta and Nannup.

Conservation status
Kunzea spathulata is classified as "not threatened" by the Western Australian Government Department of Parks and Wildlife.

References

spathulata
Endemic flora of Western Australia
Myrtales of Australia
Rosids of Western Australia
Plants described in 1996
Taxa named by Hellmut R. Toelken